The 1935/1936 Daily Mail Gold Cup was a professional billiards tournament sponsored by the Daily Mail. With 5 wins Melbourne Inman won the Gold Cup, winning five of his six matches, ahead of Sidney Smith who had four wins. It was the second Daily Mail Gold Cup tournament, an event which ran from 1935 to 1940.

Format
The second event had the same format as the first and was played from 30 December 1935 to 21 March 1936. Most of the matches were played at Thurston's Hall in London, England. There were 7 competitors and a total of 21 matches. The 7 competitors were Joe Davis, Tom Newman, Melbourne Inman, Tom Reece, Claude Falkiner, Horace Lindrum and Sidney Smith. The sessions were reduced to 1 hour and 45 minutes rather than the 2 hours in the previous year's event.

Results

Table

References

1935-1936
1935 in cue sports
1936 in cue sports
1935 in English sport
1936 in English sport
1935 sports events in London
1936 sports events in London